Tirupathur taluk is a taluk in the Sivaganga district of the Indian state of Tamil Nadu. The headquarters of the taluk is the town of Tirupathur.

Demographics
According to the 2011 census, the taluk of Tirupathur had a population of 275,884, with 138,195 males and 137,689 females. There were 996 women for every 1000 men. The taluk had a literacy rate of 69.64. Child population in the age group below six was 13,657 males and 12,983 females.

References 

Taluks of Sivaganga district